Xintun Subdistrict is a subdistrict of Dongzhou District, Fushun, Liaoning province, People's Republic of China. , it has 9 residential communities under its administration.

See also 
 List of township-level divisions of Liaoning

References 

Township-level divisions of Liaoning